Marek Semjan (born 7 November 1987) is a Slovak tennis player playing on the ATP Challenger Tour. On 30 August 2010, he reached his highest ATP singles ranking of 218.

Career
He won over top seed Fernando Verdasco at the 2012 UniCredit Czech Open in Prostějov in three sets 6-4, 6-7 (5-7), 6-4.

Challenger finals

Singles: 2 (0–2)

Doubles: 2 (2–0)

References

External links

1987 births
Living people
Slovak male tennis players